Abdulafees Abdulsalam (born 13 April 1984) is a Nigerian football player. He is an attacking player who can play striker based on his physical capability and football sense.

Abdulafees has played for clubs in Nigeria, Benin, China, Malaysia and the Middle East.

In the second transfer window of the 2014 Malaysia Super League in April 2014, he joined Perak FA after a successful trial.

He was a part of the Nigeria U17 in 2001 African U-17 Championship, who finished as the first rank in Group A, making it through to the next round, before winning gold medal in Seychelles

Honours

Club
Qatar 2nd Division League Winners, Highest Goal Scorer - 2011

Qatar 2nd Division FA Cup winner, Highest Goal Scorer - 2011

Sheikh Jasim Cup, Qatar, Highest Goal Scorer - 2011

Bahrain Premier League, 2nd Highest Goal Scorer - 2010

China Premier League, 3rd Highest Goal Scorer - 2009

Malaysia Premier League, 2nd Top Scorer and Shahzan muda FC Top Scorer- 2006–2007

MVP - Shahzan Muda FC 2005–2006

Malaysia Premier League 2nd Top Scorer and Shahzan Muda FC Top Scorer- 2005–2006

Promotion to Premier League - 2005

League Champion: Shahzan Muda FC - Malaysia Premier II (Promoted to Div1).2004-2005

League Champion:  Mogart 90 FC - Benin Republic Div. 1 - 2003–2004

League 2nd Finish:  Nitel FC, Nigeria Pro Div. 1 League - 2002–2003

Champion of Africa: U-17 Nation Cup - 20

References

External links
 Abdulafees Official Website

Living people
Association football forwards
Nigerian footballers
Nigerian expatriate footballers
Expatriate footballers in China
Expatriate footballers in Malaysia
Nigerian expatriate sportspeople in Malaysia
Place of birth missing (living people)
Perak F.C. players
China League One players
Yanbian Funde F.C. players
Mogas 90 FC players
NITEL Vasco Da Gama F.C. players
1984 births